The pygmy rabbit (Brachylagus idahoensis) is a rabbit species native to the United States. It is also the only native rabbit species in North America to dig its own burrow. The pygmy rabbit differs significantly from species within either the Lepus (hare) or Sylvilagus (cottontail) genera and is generally considered to be within the monotypic genus Brachylagus.  One isolated population, the Columbia Basin pygmy rabbit,  is listed as an endangered species by the U.S. Federal government, though the International Union for Conservation of Nature lists the species as lower risk.

Description
The pygmy rabbit is distinguishable from other leporids by its small size, short ears, gray color, small hind legs, and lack of white fuzzy fur.

Distribution
The range of the pygmy rabbit includes most of the Great Basin and some of the adjacent intermountain areas of western North America. Pygmy rabbits are found in southwestern Montana from the extreme southwest corner near the Idaho border north to Dillon and Bannack in Beaverhead County. Distribution continues west to southern Idaho and southern Oregon and south to northern Utah, northern Nevada, and eastern California. Isolated populations occur in east-central Washington and Wyoming.

The last male purebred Columbia Basin pygmy rabbit, found only in the Columbia Basin of Washington state, died March 30, 2006, at the Oregon Zoo in Portland. The last purebred female died in 2008. A crossbreeding program conducted by the Oregon Zoo, Washington State University and Northwest Trek is attempting to preserve the genetic line by breeding surviving females with the Idaho pygmy rabbit.

Lifecycle
Pygmy rabbits are capable of breeding when they are about 1 year old.

The breeding season of pygmy rabbits is very short. In Idaho it lasts from March through May; in Utah, from February through March. The gestation period of pygmy rabbits is unknown. It is between 27 and 30 days in various species of cottontails (Sylvilagus spp.). An average of six young are born per litter and a maximum of three litters are produced per year. In Idaho the third litter is generally produced in June. It is unlikely that litters are produced in the fall.

The growth rates of juveniles are dependent on the date of birth. Young from early litters grow larger due to a longer developmental period prior to their first winter.

The mortality of adults is highest in late winter and early spring. Green and Flinders reported a maximum estimated annual adult mortality of 88% in Idaho. Juvenile mortality was highest from birth to 5 weeks of age.

Pygmy rabbits may be active at any time of day; however, they are generally most active at dusk and dawn. They usually rest near or inside their burrows during midday.

Habitat
Pygmy rabbits are normally found in areas on deep soils with tall, dense sagebrush which they use for shelter and food. Individual sagebrush plants in areas inhabited by pygmy rabbits are often 6 feet (1.8 m) or more in height. Extensive, well-used runways interlace the sage thickets and provide travel and escape routes. Dense
stands of big sagebrush along streams, roads, and fencerows provide dispersal corridors for pygmy rabbits.

The pygmy rabbit is the only leporid native to North America that digs burrows. Juveniles use burrows more than other age groups. Early reproductive activities of adults may be concentrated at burrows. When pygmy rabbits can utilize sagebrush cover, burrow use is decreased. Pygmy rabbits use burrows more in the winter for thermal cover than at other times of the year.

Burrows are usually located on slopes at the base of sagebrush plants, and face north to east. Burrows typically have 4 or 5 entrances but may have as few as 2 or as many as 10. In Oregon, pygmy rabbits inhabited areas where soils were significantly deeper and looser than soils at adjacent sites. Site selection was probably related to ease of excavation of burrows. In areas where soil is shallow pygmy rabbits live in holes among volcanic rocks, in stone walls, around abandoned buildings, and in burrows made by badgers (Taxidea taxus) and marmots (Marmota flaviventris).

Some areas inhabited by pygmy rabbits are covered with several feet of snow for up to 2 or more months during the winter. During periods when the snow has covered most of the sagebrush, pygmy rabbits tunnel beneath the snow to find food. Snow tunnels are approximately the same height and width as burrows. They are quite extensive and extend from one sagebrush to another. Above ground movement during the winter months is restricted to these tunnel systems.

Cover requirements
Pygmy rabbits are restricted to areas with heavy shrub cover. Pygmy rabbits are seldom found in areas of sparse vegetative cover and seem to be reluctant to cross open space. In southeastern Idaho, woody cover and shrub height were significantly (P<0.01) greater on sites occupied by pygmy rabbits than on other sites in the same area.

Plant communities
Pygmy rabbits are found primarily in big sagebrush (Artemisia tridentata) and rabbitbrush (Chrysothamnus spp.) dominated communities. Pygmy rabbits are also found in areas where greasewood (Sarcobatus spp.) is abundant. Some woody species found on sites inhabited by pygmy rabbits in southeastern Idaho include big sagebrush, antelope bitterbrush (Purshia tridentata), threetip sagebrush (A. tripartita), low rabbitbrush (C. viscidiflorus), gray horsebrush (Tetradymia canescens), and prickly phlox (Leptodactylon pungens). Grasses and forbs include thick spike wheatgrass (Elymus lanceolatus), plains reedgrass (Calamagrostis montanensis), sedges (Carex spp.), prairie junegrass (Koeleria macrantha), Sandberg bluegrass (Poa secunda), bluegrass (Poa spp.), needle-and-thread grass (Stipa comata), western yarrow (Achillea millefolium), rosy pussytoes (Antennaria microphylla), milkvetch (Astragalus spp.), arrowleaf balsamroot (Balsamorhiza sagittata), buckwheat (Eriogonum spp.), tailcup lupine (Lupinus caudatus), and phlox (Phlox spp.). In the Upper Sonoran Desert pygmy rabbits occur in desert sagebrush associations dominated by big sagebrush and rabbitbrush with bitterbrush and sulphurflower (Eriogonum umbellatum var. stellatum).

Food habits
The primary food of pygmy rabbits is big sagebrush, which may comprise up to 99% of the food eaten in the winter. Grasses and forbs are also eaten from mid- to late summer. In Idaho, Gates and Eng found that shrubs contributed 85.2% (unweighted mean) of pygmy rabbit diets from July to December. Shrub use was lowest in August (73.1%) and highest in December (97.9%). Big sagebrush was the most important shrub in the July to December diet (54.2%), followed by
rubber rabbitbrush (Chrysothamnus nauseosus, 25.8%) and winterfat (Krascheninnikovia lananta, 4.6%). Grasses comprised 10% of the July to December diet and were consumed mostly during July and August. Indian ricegrass (Oryzopsis hymenoides) and needlegrass (Stipa spp.) were the most important grasses consumed. Forbs contributed 4.9% of the July to December diet.

In southeastern Idaho, Green and Flinders found that pygmy rabbits ate big sagebrush throughout the year but in lesser amounts in summer (51% of diet) than in winter (99% of diet). Other shrubs in the area were consumed infrequently. Grass and forb consumption was relatively constant throughout the summer (39% and 10% of diet respectively) and decreased to a trace amount through fall and winter. Thickspike wheatgrass, bluebunch wheatgrass (Pseudoroegneria spicata), and Sandberg bluegrass were preferred foods in the summer.

Predators
Weasels (Mustela and Neogale spp.) are the principal predators of pygmy rabbits. Coyotes (Canis latrans), red foxes (Vulpes vulpes), American badgers (Taxidea taxus), bobcats (Lynx rufus), great horned owls (Bubo virginianus) and northern harriers (Circus hudsonius) also prey on pygmy rabbits.

Listing status
On September 26, 2007, Judge Edward Lodge of the United States District Court for the District of Idaho granted litigant party Western Watersheds Project summary judgment remanding the United States Fish and Wildlife Service 90-day finding denying conservationist parties' listing petition. The petition sought legal protection for pygmy rabbit as an endangered or threatened species.

References

External links

Leporidae
Rabbit, Pygmy
Rabbit, Pygmy
Mammals described in 1891
ESA endangered species
Taxa named by Clinton Hart Merriam
Endemic fauna of the United States